The Suli An is a han in the Old Bazaar of Skopje, North Macedonia. It was built in the mid-15th century by Isa-Beg Isaković.

Etymology 
The name of the han is derived from the Turkish Sulu Han, with su which meaning water, and the word sulu meaning "with water". This name was probably chosen because a small river used to run near the han.

Characteristics 
The total area of the han is around 2,100m². During the Ottoman Empire, the Suli An was a classic city han for travelers and traders with their caravans.

The Suli An was damaged in the 1963 Skopje earthquake but was reconstructed in 1972.

Today, the building houses the Skopje Faculty of Arts and the Museum of the Old Bazaar of Skopje.

See also
Caravanserai
Old Bazaar, Skopje
Ottoman Vardar Macedonia

External links 
 Text about Suli an on web site about Old Skopje

Ottoman architecture in North Macedonia
Buildings and structures in Skopje
Caravanserais in the Balkans
Bazaars
Caravanserais in North Macedonia
Old Bazaar, Skopje